The 1995 Scott Tournament of Hearts Canadian women's national curling championship, was played February 18 to 26 at the Max Bell Centre in Calgary, Alberta. It was the first time the page-playoff system would be used at the Scott.

Teams

Standings

Results

Draw 1

Draw 2

Draw 3

Draw 4

Draw 5

Draw 6

Draw 7

Draw 8

Draw 9

Draw 10

Draw 11

Draw 12

Draw 13

Draw 14

Draw 15

Draw 16

Draw 17

TieBreaker 1

TieBreaker 2

Page playoffs

1 vs. 2

3 vs. 4

Semi-final

Final

References

External links
 Video: 

Scotties Tournament of Hearts
Scott Tournament of Hearts
Scott Tournament Of Hearts, 1995
Curling competitions in Calgary
1995 in women's curling
February 1995 sports events in North America